Live at CBGB's 1984 is a live album by American crossover thrash band D.R.I., released in 2005. It features a live performance of the band at the famous music venue CBGB in New York City.

The audio of the performance is very raw, and the quality drops significantly in the recording at around track 32

Track listing
 I Don't Need Society 01:32
 Reaganomics 00:33
 Commuter Man 00:47
 Plastique 00:17
 Why 00:14
 Balance of Terror 00:55
 My Fate to Hate 00:21
 Who Am I 00:29
 Money Stinks 00:41
 Human Waste 00:19
 Yes Ma'am 01:39
 Dennis' Problem 00:47
 Closet Punk 00:38
 How to Act 01:01
 Give My Taxes Back 00:47
 Equal People 00:41
 On My Way Home 00:51
 Bail Out 00:46
 Snap 01:03
 The Explorer 01:29
 Slit My Wrists 00:20
 Stupid War 00:59
 Counter Attack 00:14
 I'd Rather Be Sleeping 01:15
 Running Around 01:07
 Couch Slouch 01:23
 To Open Closed Doors 00:30
 God Is Broke 01:14
 Soup Kitchen 01:50
 Sad to Be 01:57
 War Crimes 01:03
 Busted 00:53
 Draft Me 00:22
 First Round Draft Choice 00:29
 Capitalists Suck 00:32
 Mad Man 01:13
 Misery Loves Company 00:41
 No Sense 01:34
 Blockhead 01:46
 Violent Pacification 04:03

Personnel 
 Spike Cassidy – guitar
 Kurt Brecht – vocals
 Josh Pappe – bass
 Eric Brecht – drums

2005 live albums
D.R.I. (band) albums